Ronald Edmond Balfour (1904 – 10 March 1945, Kleve) was a British medieval historian and a fellow of King's College, Cambridge.

Balfour was educated at Eton and King's, Cambridge, matriculating in 1922. He was elected a Fellow of King's College in 1928 and Lecturer in History in 1930.

War service
During the Second World War he held administrative posts with the French section of the Ministry of Information. In 1941 he was commissioned in the King's Royal Rifle Corps
then worked in Winchester and York interviewing recruits and finally with the Monuments, Fine Arts and Archives section (MFAA) of the Supreme Headquarters Allied Expeditionary Force. He was killed by a shell-burst while operating beyond the Allied front line at Kleve (Cleves), seeking out artworks to be protected from war damage. He is buried in Reichswald Forest War Cemetery.

Legacy
He bequeathed his personal library of 8,000 books to be divided between the Cambridge University Library and the King's College Library.

In the 2014 film The Monuments Men, he is loosely represented by fictional British officer "Donald Jeffries", played by Hugh Bonneville.

References

External links
 Monuments men: Ronald Edmond Balfour
 George Clooney's Nazi art theft film attacked for ignoring real-life British war hero

1904 births
1945 deaths
People educated at Eton College
Fellows of King's College, Cambridge
Monuments men
20th-century English historians
King's Royal Rifle Corps officers
British Army personnel killed in World War II